This is a discography of audio and video recordings of Carmen, a French-language opera by Georges Bizet. The opera premiered at the Opéra-Comique in Paris on 3 March 1875. Carmen is one of the most frequently recorded operas, dating back to a near-complete German acoustical recording in 1908.

Audio recordings

Video recordings

References
Notes

Sources
Blyth, Alan, ed. Opera on Record. Hutchinson & Co., London. 1979.
Gruber, Paul, ed. The Metropolitan Opera Guide to Recorded Opera. W. W. Norton & Company, New York and London: Thames and Hudson, 1993 

Opera discographies
Operas by Georges Bizet